Use of the shorthand term Policy Project can refer to several organizations, including:
The Global Water Policy Project (GWPP), a group working to improve global access to fresh water
The Free Expression Policy Project (FEPP), a civil liberties organization
The Marijuana Policy Project (MPP), a group advocating for legal reforms on cannabis
The Science & Environmental Policy Project (SEPP), an organization promoting skepticism of global warming

See also
Public policy
Policy (disambiguation)
Project (disambiguation)